Kakkera  is a TMC in the southern state of Karnataka, India. Administratively, it is in the Shorapur taluka of Yadgir district in Karnataka state.

Demographics
 India census, Kakkera had a population of 35,492 with 18,345 males and 17,147 females.

See also
 Yadgir

References

External links
 

 Cities and towns in Yadgir district